The Essex was an American R&B vocal group formed in 1962. They are best known for their 1963 song "Easier Said Than Done".

Career
Founding members Walter Vickers (guitar) and Rodney Taylor (drums) were members of the United States Marine Corps stationed in Okinawa, Japan. After being transferred to Camp LeJeune in North Carolina, they enlisted fellow Marines Billy Hill (aka Billy Proctor) and Rudolph Johnson as group members. Next they added a female lead singer, Anita Humes, another Marine.

The band was signed to a recording contract in 1963 after submitting a demo to Roulette Records. "Easier Said Than Done"  was written by Larry Huff and William Linton. Released as the B side of their first single, the song reached the top of the U.S. Billboard Hot 100 chart. The track sold over one million records and received a gold disc award from the R.I.A.A. "Easier Said Than Done" charted at No. 41 in the UK Singles Chart in August 1963.

Rudolph Johnson left the group, and the Essex became a quartet. Three months after "Easier Said Than Done" reached No. 1 in July 1963, the group had a No. 12 Billboard hit with the follow-up song, "A Walkin' Miracle" in September 1963. On the label of this single, the group name appeared as 'The Essex Featuring Anita Humes.' "She's Got Everything", their next single, written by Jimmy Radcliffe and Oramay Diamond, was a Billboard No. 56 hit. Being Marines made it hard for the group to take advantage of their hits; for example, before long, Johnson was posted to Okinawa. Rodney Taylor was killed in 1966 in New York City during an attempted mugging. He was buried at Oak Hill Cemetery in Gary, Indiana. All of his former bandmates attended his funeral.

Humes released several solo singles for Roulette, but had no chart success. She died on May 30, 2010, in Harrisburg, Pennsylvania, aged 69. In the 1970s, Hill headed up a group called the Courtship.

Band member origins
Walter Vickers - New Brunswick, New Jersey
Rodney Taylor - Gary, Indiana
Rudolph Johnson - New York
Willie "Billy" Hill - Princeton, New Jersey
Anita Humes - Harrisburg, Pennsylvania

Discography

Albums

Singles

See also
List of artists who reached number one in the United States
List of artists who reached number one on the Billboard R&B chart
List of R&B musicians

References

Bibliography
Joel Whitburn. Top 40 Hits. .

Footnotes

External links
 
 Songfacts

Musical groups established in 1961
American rhythm and blues musical groups
United States Marines
Roulette Records artists
1961 establishments in North Carolina